Ezira is an Igbo speaking town in south eastern Nigeria in the Orumba South local government area, Anambra state, Ezira is also known as Eziha (Ozi Mba Ihe) which means "showing others the light" in the indigenous language. It has four satellite villages Obuotu, Ubaha, Imoohia and Okii, of which Obuotu is the head of the villages.

Ezira is an ancient town known for its divination of sun, and is surrounded by Umunze, Isulo, Eziagu, Umuchu and Achina. Ezira is thought to be the oldest town in the area, with myths and legends that stretches back to 9th century AD, as revealed by archaeological excavations of works of art in iron, bronze, bells, bracelets copper and pottery at Ezira.

References

Populated places in Anambra State